BIW may refer to:

Body in white (BiW), a stage in automotive design
biw, ISO 639 language code for the Kol language (Cameroon)
BIW, rail station code for Biggleswade railway station, Biggleswade, Bedfordshire, England, UK
Bürger in Wut ("Citizens in Rage"), a German political party
Business is War, a type of Business war games
Bath Iron Works, a shipyard in Maine, US
Beloit Iron Works (later Beloit Corporation), a former manufacturing company in Beloit, Wisconsin, US 
Brillion Iron Works, a former manufacturing company in Brillion, Wisconsin, US
BIW Technologies, a former British software company, now part of Oracle

See also